The Pilot Island NW Site is the site of three shipwrecks on the northwest side of Pilot Island in Door County, Wisconsin. The shipwrecks lie in Lake Michigan under  of water; buoys placed by the Wisconsin Historical Society mark their locations. The first ship, the Forest, sank at a shoal on Pilot Island on October 28, 1891, while attempting to pass through Porte des Morts. In 1892, the J.E. Gilmore sank at the site while navigating the passage on October 17. The third ship, the A.P. Nichols, sank at the site in a storm on October 28 of the same year. The site was added to the National Register of Historic Places on March 19, 1992.

References

Shipwrecks on the National Register of Historic Places in Wisconsin
National Register of Historic Places in Door County, Wisconsin
Maritime incidents in 1891
Maritime incidents in 1892
1891 establishments in Wisconsin
1892 establishments in Wisconsin